Anne Warren Weston (July 13, 1812 – 1890) was an American abolitionist. She is largely memorialized by the letters she wrote to the Boston Female Anti-Slavery Society, and others.

Biography

Early life
Anne Warren Weston was born in Weymouth, Massachusetts on July 13, 1812.

Expanded description
Weston wrote letters to the Boston Female Anti-Slavery Society, detailing the expectations and persecution of abolitionism. She gave a circular to the Abolitionists of Massachusetts.

Death and afterward
Weston died in 1890.

Philosophical and political views
In her Circular to Abolitionists of Massachusetts, Weston lays out a set of guidelines for the Anti-Slavery Society to carry forth their goals, including having men and women sign separate documents and sending all signed memorials to the legislature. She cites the Preamble to the United States Constitution as evidence that the legislation of Massachusetts is hypocritical in their refusal to provide life, liberty, and the pursuit of happiness to a portion of the population.

Bibliography
 "Anne Warren Weston." Women in Peace. 
 Weston, Anne Warren. Letter from Anne Warren Weston to Boston Female Anti-Slavery Society. 
 Weston, Anne Warren. Circular to Abolitionists of Massachusetts.

See also
Boston Female Anti-Slavery Society

References

External links
 https://dp.la/primary-source-sets/women-of-the-antebellum-reform-movement/sources/1079 
 https://en.wikisource.org/wiki/Letter_from_Anne_Warren_Weston_to_Boston_Female_Anti-slavery_Society
 http://n2t.net/ark:/99166/w6sx6n1v
 Lee V. Chambers. The Weston Sisters: An American Abolitionist Family. Chapel Hill: The University of North Carolina Press, 2014. 
 Speicher, Anna M. The Religious World of Antislavery Women: Spirituality in the Lives of Five Abolitionist Lecturers. Vol. 1st ed. Women and Gender in North American Religions. New York: Syracuse University Press, 2000.
https://en.wikisource.org/wiki/Letter_from_Anne_Warren_Weston_to_Caroline_Weston
https://en.wikisource.org/wiki/Circular_to_Abolitionists_of_Massachusettes
https://www.womeninpeace.org/w-names/2017/7/18/anne-warren-weston

American abolitionists
1812 births
1890 deaths